George W. Gage (March 9, 1812 – September 24, 1875) was an American baseball executive businessman, and politician who served as president of the Chicago White Stockings from 1872 to 1875. He ran unsuccessfully for mayor of Chicago in 1869 as the Republican nominee and served as a member of the South Parks Commission. After he died in 1875, the city named a park after him, making him the namesake of Gage Park and the Chicago community of the same name.

Early life
Gage was born in Pelham, New Hampshire on March 9, 1812. He received a common school education.

Business career
Gage started his career as a machinist in Lowell, Massachusetts. He began working in the hotel business in Methuen, Massachusetts, going to work in series of hotels in different parts of Massachusetts. He worked in the Merrimack House in Lowell, before moving on to Wild's Hotel in Boston. He then became the proprietor of the City Hotel in that city, being well regarded in that role.

Gage moved to Chicago in 1853. In 1853, the Gage brothers acquired the lease of the Tremont House. They brothers the Tremont House the most popular hotel in the city. Together the brothers became prominent Chicago businessmen after running the Tremont House hotel and investing heavily in real estate. After his success with the Tremont House, Gage began to also operate the equally-famous Sherman House Hotel, doing so until the Great Chicago Fire of 1871.

Baseball
The Chicago White Stockings had been disbanded following the Great Chicago Fire. On June 6, 1872, Gage was elected president of the "Chicago Base Ball Association," the corporate name of the White Stockings. The group intended to bring professional baseball back to Chicago. The White Stockings team was revived in 1874, and Gage served as president until his death 1875.

Government and politics
An active Republican, he lost the 1869 Chicago mayoral election a race. Gage was later appointed a city park commissioner on the South Park Commission.

Death
Gage died on September 24, 1875 after a short period of illness. His death was seen as a suprise. After Gage died in office as a commissioner of the South Park Commission, Gage Park, on the city's southwest side, was named after him. After his death, Gage was succeeded as president of the Chicago Base Ball Association by team secretary William Hulbert. Gage was Survived by six children and his widow.

References

External links

1812 births
1875 deaths
Businesspeople from Chicago
19th-century American businesspeople